Wolfgang Amadeus Mozart's Piano Sonata in F major, K. 547a (Anh. 135) is a sonata in two movements. It was originally published as an original sonata by Breitkopf and Härtel in 1799 but was soon found to be an amalgam of movements culled from other compositions. It is sometimes called Mozart's Piano Sonata No. 19.

Movements
The work has two movements:

The set of six keyboard variations on an original Andante, KV 54/547b/Anh.138a are sometimes played as an additional third movement to this piece.  These variations are themselves also transcribed from the same violin sonata (K. 547) as the Allegro with its fourth variation (which was violin-centric in the original) re-written.

See also
Piano Sonata in B-flat major, K. 498a (Mozart)

Notes

External links

 (Third movement, K. 54/547b)
The Complete Mozart Piano Sonatas / Rodrian - MIDI files of the work. Here this sonata is moved into the canon and is placed as Piano Sonata No. 16, thus pushing the Sonata facile down to No. 17.

Piano Sonata 547a
Compositions in F major
Compositions by Wolfgang Amadeus Mozart published posthumously
Mozart: spurious and doubtful works